The South Alberta Light Horse (SALH) is a Canadian Army armoured reconnaissance regiment of the Canadian Army Reserve. It traces its complicated lineage to the Rocky Mountain Rangers, and claims its direct ancestry to the 15th Light Horse, along with various other Alberta based cavalry units. The "Light Horse" designation comes from its light cavalry and mounted infantry origins.

The SALH is part of 41 Canadian Brigade Group of the 3rd Canadian Division, and is based in Medicine Hat, Edmonton and Lethbridge, Alberta.

History

Early history
The South Alberta Light Horse traces its beginnings to the period of the Riel Rebellion of 1885. During this conflict the Rocky Mountain Rangers (RMR) of Fort Macleod, which comprised 150 officers and men, were tasked with the protection of the area ranging from the U.S. border to the High River and from the Rockies to Medicine Hat. The RMR saw no action during their three months of existence during the rebellion, and the SALH carries the battle honour "North West Canada, 1885" on their colours.

This irregular light cavalry unit is seen as the true genesis of the regiment. The 15th Light Horse, the official direct ancestor of the SALH, was raised in Calgary on July 3, 1905. It consisted of four newly organized cavalry squadrons: Calgary (A Squadron), Fort MacLeod (B Squadron), High River (C Squadron), and Cochrane (D Squadron).  From this point until the mid-1950s the regiment's history can be described as a series of complicated amalgamations and redesignations of Alberta army reserve units of all arms until the regiment as it is now was formed in Calgary in 1954. At the beginning of the First World War, the Alberta militia units destined to become part of SALH were four cavalry regiments – 15th Light Horse in Calgary, 19th Alberta Dragoons in Edmonton, 21st Alberta Hussars in Medicine Hat and 23rd Alberta Rangers in Fort Macleod – and two infantry regiments (101st Regiment "Edmonton Fusiliers" and 103rd Regiment "Calgary Rifles").

WWI and interregnum 

In the First World War, instead of mobilising the Canadian militia to send overseas, new units were formed from volunteers of the militia and general public. The militia units generally became organizations for recruiting, induction and preliminary training for the new units. The 19th Alberta Dragoons recruited the 1st Divisional Cavalry Squadron, CEF, which landed in France in February 1915. After other divisions joined the 1st Canadian Division in France and the Canadian Corps was formed, the squadron was attached to the corps and became A Squadron, Canadian Light Horse, CEF. The troopers of this squadron wore 19th Alberta Dragoon badges throughout the war.Also recruited by SALH's predecessors were three regiments of Canadian Mounted Rifles (CMR): the 3rd, 12th and 13th. The 3rd Regiment, Canadian Mounted Rifles, CEF, was mobilized at Medicine Hat and landed in France in September 1915 as part of the 1st CMR Brigade. At the end of 1915, the CMR units in France were converted from two cavalry brigades (six regiments) into one infantry brigade (four battalions). The troopers of the 3rd Regiment were split up, half going to the 1st CMR Battalion and half to the 2nd CMR Battalion; both these battalions fought in the 3rd Canadian Division. The 12th and 13th Regiments CMR were broken up for reinforcements in England.

The SALH also counts a First World War artillery unit as an ancestor: 22nd (Howitzer) Battery, CFA, CEF. The battery landed in France on 19 January 1916, where it served as part of the 6th Brigade, 2nd Canadian Divisional Artillery until the end of the war. The battery was demobilized at Hamilton, 25 May 1919, and was disbanded on 1 November 1920. The battery is perpetuated by the 22nd Field Battery, RCA, Gleichen Alberta.

Of the eight infantry battalions recruited by the SALH's predecessors, only one entered combat as a unit. The 31st Battalion, CEF, landed in France in September 1915 with the 2nd Canadian Division. It was awarded 22 battle honours, including such notable actions as Vimy and Passchendaele. The other seven battalions – 9th, 66th (Edmonton Guards), 113th Battalion (Lethbridge Highlanders), CEF, 138th (Edmonton), 175th (Medicine Hat), 187th (Central Alberta) and 202nd (Sportsman's) – were broken up for reinforcements in England. 

The 31st Battalion (part of the 6th Infantry Brigade) participated in the first tank attack in history at the Battle of Flers-Courcelette on 15 September 1916, while A Squadron, Canadian Light Horse, made the last cavalry charge in Canadian history at the battle of Iwuy on 10 October 1918. This means that among the predecessor units of the SALH, one participated in the first military operation involving the tank and another mounted the last cavalry charge in Canadian history.

The period between the world wars saw two major reorganizations of the Canadian Militia, the first from 1920 to 1924 and the second from 1935 to 1936. By the outbreak of the Second World War, the ancestors of the SALH were two cavalry regiments (15th Alberta Light Horse in Calgary and 19th Alberta Dragoons in Edmonton) an independent artillery battery (22nd Field Battery, RCA, in Gleichen) and two infantry battalions (The Edmonton Fusiliers and the South Alberta Regiment in Medicine Hat).

Second World War

The 15th Alberta Light Horse contributed to several active service units, including the 31st (Alberta) Reconnaissance Regiment which remained in the Calgary area until the last year of the war. The South Alberta Regiment, recruited an active service battalion in the Medicine Hat area in the summer of 1940. This infantry unit trained in Canada until 1942 when it was reorganized as the 29th Armoured Regiment (The South Alberta Regiment) and moved to England in August. The SAR was granted 15 battle honours for its service overseas, redesignated the 29th Armoured Reconnaissance Regiment (The South Alberta Regiment) in 1944. The unit was selected by Major-General F. F. Worthington to be the reconnaissance regiment of the 4th Canadian (Armoured) Division because he wanted "keen-eyed prairie men" as his scouts. The 29th was again converted, with all armoured reconnaissance regiments, to the war establishment of a regular armoured regiment in 1944 and sent to France in July of that year. It fought through Normandy, Belgium, the Scheldt, the Rhineland, the Netherlands and Germany until the end of the war in Europe in May 1945. 

The 22nd Field Battery became part of the 13th Field Regiment, which landed with the 3rd Canadian Infantry Division on D-Day at Juno Beach.

The Edmonton Fusiliers raised two active battalions, one for the 6th Canadian Infantry Division and one for the 8th Canadian Infantry Division. Both these divisions were home defence formations that did not go overseas.

Meanwhile, the 31st (Alberta) Reconnaissance Regiment had served in the Calgary area until January 1945 when it was shipped to England. It was disbanded a month later and broken up for reinforcements.

Postwar
The end of the war saw the re-emergence of The South Alberta Regiment (infantry) in Medicine Hat and the 15th Alberta Light Horse (armoured) in Calgary. The 15th however, was not to keep its name, and it was united with the 22nd Field Battery and renamed 68th Light Anti-Aircraft Regiment, RCA. This remained until 1954 when it united with The South Alberta Regiment of Medicine Hat and the 41st Anti-Tank Regiment out of Calgary to become The South Alberta Light Horse (29th Armoured Regiment) out of Calgary. In 1958 "29th Armoured Regiment" was dropped from the name, and two years later, in 1960, the regiment was moved back to its old headquarters in Medicine Hat. The regiment remained an army reserve armoured unit until 1968 when it lost its tanks and was retasked as an armoured reconnaissance unit.

The two Edmonton units (19th Alberta Dragoons and The Edmonton Fusiliers) merged in 1946 as the 19th (Alberta) Armoured Car Regiment, RCAC. This regiment was renamed back to 19th Alberta Dragoons in 1958, but in the 1965 reorganization of the Reserves it was transferred to the Supplementary Order of Battle: it still legally existed, but had no personnel assigned to it.

Recent history (1970–present) 
In 1978 the SALH established an independent B Squadron in Edmonton to train out of Griesbach Barracks, and was originally organized as a reconnaissance unit. Though later,  B Squadron transitioned to AVGP and was redesignated as armoured squadron in the early 1980s. In line with this change, the rest of the regiment followed suit and by 1985 the entire regiment returned to being an armoured regiment.

In 2005, the AVGP Cougar was retired from service, and the SALH reroled back to Armoured Reconnaissance, equipped with the Mercedes-Benz G Wagon - Light Utility Vehicle Wheeled (LUVW). 

The regiment exercised its Freedom of the City of Medicine Hat In 2006, the SALH formally amalgamated with the nil-strength 19th Alberta Dragoons, a regiment that had been on the Supplementary Order of Battle since 1965, and now officially maintains the battle honours and traditions of its Edmonton predecessors.

In the Spring of 2015, the regiment sought and received permission to detach 3 Troop, A Squadron from Medicine Hat to Lethbridge, as recruiting in the Lethbridge region had been successful enough to support several troopers travelling to Medicine Hat on a weekly basis for training.  As this group grew, it became possible to detach 3 Troop to its own lines co-located with the 20th Independent Field Battery, RCA, at the Vimy Ridge Armoury in Lethbridge.

The regiment is presently training with the new Textron Tactical Armoured Patrol Vehicle, which was delivered to 3rd Canadian Division units in the Spring to Summer of 2017.

Lineage

1885–1914

1914-1939

1945-present

Battle honours

North West Rebellion

The Great War

Second World War

War in Afghanistan

Alliances 
 – The Light Dragoons
 – The Princess of Wales's Royal Regiment (Queen's and Royal Hampshires)

Regimental organization
The regiment has soldiers in Edmonton, Medicine Hat, and Lethbridge. With the advent of the Land Force Reserve Restructuring project, The South Alberta Light Horse was organized as an armoured reconnaissance regiment on September 1, 2004.

The commanding officer of the SALH is Lieutenant-Colonel Mike Onieu. The regimental sergeant-major is Chief Warrant Officer Gerry D. Olsen.

Cadet units
There are several Royal Canadian Army Cadets units spread across Alberta that are affiliated to the South Alberta Light Horse.

Cadet units affiliated to the South Alberta Light Horse receive support and also are entitled to wear traditional regimental accoutrements on their uniforms.

Order of precedence

References
Century of Service: The History of the South Alberta Light Horse by Donald E. Graves, 
South Albertas: A Canadian Regiment at War by Donald E. Graves

Media
Century of Service: The History of the South Alberta Light Horse by Donald E. Graves (May 15, 2005)

External links

South Alberta Light Horse Foundation page
South Alberta Light Horse Cadets page

South Alberta Light Horse
Organizations based in Edmonton
Military units and formations of Alberta
1954 establishments in Alberta
Military units and formations established in 1885